A.D. 81 (LXXXI) was a common year starting on Monday (link will display the full calendar) of the Julian calendar. At the time, it was known as the Year of the Consulship of Silva and Pollio (or, less frequently, year 834 Ab urbe condita). The denomination A.D. 81 for this year has been used since the early medieval period, when the Anno Domini calendar era became the prevalent method in Europe for naming years.

Events

By place

Roman Empire 
 September 14 – Domitian succeeds his brother Titus as emperor. Domitian is not a soldier like his two predecessors, and his administration is directed towards the reinforcement of a monarchy.  By taking the title of Dominus ("lord"), he scandalizes the senatorial aristocracy. Romanisation progresses in the provinces, and life in the cities is greatly improved.  Many provincials – Spanish, Gallic, and African – become Senators.
 The Arch of Titus is constructed.
 Pliny the Younger is flamen Divi Augusti (priest in the cult of the Emperor).

By topic

Commerce 
 The silver content of the Roman denarius rises to 92% under emperor Domitian, up from 81% in the reign of Vitellius.

Religion 
 Possible date of the First Epistle of Peter.
</onlyinclude>

Births 
 Deng Sui, Chinese empress of the Han Dynasty (d. 121)

Deaths 
 September 13 – Titus, Roman emperor (b. AD 39)
 Artabanus III, king of the Parthian Empire

References 

0081

als:80er#Johr 81